Gaian may refer to:

Nonfiction
 An adherent of Gaianism
 A person who adopts technogaianism, a slant on Gaianism that embraces a symbiosis between the emergence of modern technology and ancient terrestrial evolutionary biology
 A follower of Gaia philosophy
 A shortened form of the Roman name Gaianus

Fiction
Gaian (demonym), a demonym commonly associated in science fiction with humans
 A faction the player can choose to control in the computer game Sid Meier's Alpha Centauri
 A user of the popular forum Gaia Online or the Avatar character used to represent the user
 The House of Gaian, from the Tir Alainn Trilogy by Anne Bishop

See also
 Gaia (disambiguation)